Yefremovsky (masculine), Yefremovskaya (feminine), or Yefremovskoye (neuter) may refer to:
Yefremovsky District, a district of Tula Oblast, Russia
Yefremovsky (rural locality) (Yefremovskaya, Yefremovskoye), several rural localities in Russia